Demi (born 1955) also known as Demi Rodríguez, is a Cuban-born American visual artist, known for her paintings of children. She lives in Miami, Florida.

Biography 
She was born on October 6, 1955 in Camagüey, Camagüey Province, Cuba. Demi is not her name from birth, however she primarily uses the mononym for her work. When she was young her father was executed in Cuba for political reasons. At the age of 6 she was sent to Puerto Rico to live with relatives she had not previously met. In 1971, Demi moved to Florida to join her family. 

She attended Miami Dade Community College (now Miami Dade College), and received an A.A. degree. 

In her early career she worked as a bookkeeper. In 1984, Demi married artist Arturo Rodríguez, whom she had met in 1978 at the former Meeting Point Gallery in Miami. Demi started painting in 1984 by learning from Arturo, and she began exhibiting her art in 1987. Her art primarily focuses on the portraits of children, often shown in situations that are trapping. She uses her practice to raise awareness for children’s rights.

Her artwork is in public museum collections, including the Lowe Art Museum, Museum of Art Fort Lauderdale, Gulf Coast Museum of Art, the Frost Art Museum, Tampa Museum of Art, and the Smithsonian American Art Museum. She is one of the featured artists of Feminist Art Base at the Brooklyn Museum.

See also 

 List of Cuban artists
 List of Cuban women artists

References

External links 
 Demi and Arturo Rodríguez papers, circa 1957-2016, from Archives of American Art, Smithsonian Institution
 Oral history interview with Arturo Rodríguez, 2020 August 26, from Archives of American Art, Smithsonian Institution
 Video: In the Artist's Studio with Demi (2020), NSU Art Museum Fort Lauderdale, via YouTube

1955 births
Living people
Miami Dade College alumni
Cuban emigrants to the United States
20th-century Cuban painters
21st-century Cuban painters
20th-century Cuban women artists
21st-century Cuban women artists
20th-century American women artists
21st-century American women artists
20th-century American painters
21st-century American painters
People from Camagüey